Varathalingam Rathnathurai (commonly known as Puthuvai Ratnathurai) is a poet, songwriter and sculptor who served as the head of Arts and Culture Division of the Liberation Tigers of Tamil Eelam (LTTE), a separatist Tamil militant organisation in Sri Lanka. He is a known personality among Eelam Tamils and has written many revolutionary songs and poetry for the LTTE. He disappeared after the end of the Sri Lankan Civil War in 2009.

Ratnathurai headed the Tamil Eelam Arts and Cultural Guild during the LTTE's de facto administration of northern Sri Lanka. On May 21, 2016, the Tamil Guardian reported that he was last seen in the custody of the Sri Lankan military on May 18, 2009, in Mullivaikkal. In 2012, Sinhala daily newspaper Divaina reported that he is in the custody of the Sri Lankan Army.This has not been confirmed by the Sri Lankan Army.

Ratnathurai began writing Tamil poetry at the age of 14. He also wrote many poems under the pseudonyms Vyasan and Malika. He wrote, Inda Maan Mukum Naman Maan which is a sentimental song that has been well received by many people. He is a native of Puttur, Jaffna district.

In September 2014, the Sri Lanka Army banned Piddukku ma’n chumantha perumaanaar, a devotional song authored by Ratnathurai.

Early life 
Hailing from a Vishwakarma community in Puttur in Jaffna, Ratnathurai was the second child of Kandiah Varathalingam, a sculptor hailing from Thirunelveli in Jaffna, and his wife Pakkiyam.

Books 
 
 
 வானம் சிவக்கிறது (1970)
 இரத்த புஷ்பங்கள்(1980)
 ஒரு தோழனின் காதற் கடிதம்
 நினைவழியா நாட்கள்
 உலைக்களம்
 பூவரசம் வேலியும் புலுனிக் குஞ்சுகளும்
 Ulaikalam, 2009

English Translations 
Some of his poems were translated into English by renowned Canadian Tamil academic Professor Chelva Kanaganayakam as part of a book titled "Wilting Laughter: Three Tamil Poets":
 December, a Thing of Beauty
 Beauty Unseen
 Writing the Remnants of a Dream
 A Poet's Fearless Death
 An Elegy for a Teacher
 The Temple Across the Field
 Waiting
 Crescent Moon
 Those Days Were Beautiful
 Yearning
 The Frolicking Clouds
 Resurgent Dawn and a Restless Poet
 The Sculptor and the Statue
 Moving River
 Silenced, the Temple Bells
 The Poet, the Wind, and the Flowers
 On the Third Day After the Festival
 Fulfilment
 Grant Me a Wish
 Three Questions
 Relationship
 Beauty and the Sea
 Bright Even in the Night
 Our Folks Are Not Ungrateful
 Where Snow Falls

Further reading

References

External links 
 A poet's fearless death at Tamil Guardian
 Puthuvai Ratnathurai's Poetry collection

1948 births
Living people
Sri Lankan poets

Sri Lankan lyricists
Sri Lankan sculptors

Sri Lankan Tamil rebels
Sri Lankan Tamil people
Liberation Tigers of Tamil Eelam members

People from Jaffna District